Transcription initiation factor TFIID subunit 1, also known as transcription initiation factor TFIID 250 kDa subunit (TAFII-250) or TBP-associated factor 250 kDa (p250), is a protein that in humans is encoded by the TAF1 gene.

Function 
Initiation of transcription by RNA polymerase II requires the activities of more than 70 polypeptides. The protein that coordinates these activities is the basal transcription factor TFIID, which binds to the core promoter to position the polymerase properly, serves as the scaffold for assembly of the remainder of the transcription complex, and acts as a channel for regulatory signals. TFIID is composed of the TATA-binding protein (TBP) and a group of evolutionarily conserved proteins known as TBP-associated factors or TAFs. TAFs may participate in basal transcription, serve as coactivators, function in promoter recognition or modify general transcription factors (GTFs) to facilitate complex assembly and transcription initiation. This gene encodes the largest subunit of TFIID. This subunit binds to core promoter sequences encompassing the transcription start site. It also binds to activators and other transcriptional regulators, and these interactions affect the rate of transcription initiation. This subunit contains two independent protein kinase domains at the N and C-terminals, but also possesses acetyltransferase activity and can act as a ubiquitin-activating/conjugating enzyme. Two transcripts encoding different isoforms have been identified for this gene.
Histones are often acetylated to open DNA for transcription. TAF1 contains two bromodomains, which each can bind one of two acetyllysine residues at position 5 and 12 in the H4 tail, to stabilize the TBP-TATA box complex.

Clinical significance 

A mutation in TAF1 was identified that contributes to a phenotype with severe intellectual disability (ID), a characteristic intergluteal crease, and distinctive facial features, including a broad, upturned nose, sagging cheeks, downward sloping palpebral fissures, prominent periorbital ridges, deep-set eyes, relative hypertelorism, thin upper lip, a high-arched palate, prominent ears with thickened helices, and a pointed chin This is a non-synonymous change in TAF1 that results in an isoleucine (hydrophobic) to threonine (polar) change on the 1337th amino acid residue in the protein (NP_001273003.1). Two other mutations were reported in TAF1 in two families with intellectual disability, although further clinical details were not reported.

Interactions 

TAF1 has been shown to interact with:

 CSNK2A1, 
 CCND1, 
 GTF2F1, 
 RB1, 
 TAF7, 
 TBP,  and
 UBTF.

See also 
Transcription factor II D

References

Further reading

External links 
 
  GeneReviews/NCBI/NIH/UW entry on X-Linked Dystonia-Parkinsonism
 http://biorxiv.org/content/early/2015/01/21/014050